The 2019–20 Cincinnati Bearcats men's basketball team represented the University of Cincinnati in the 2019–20 NCAA Division I men's basketball season. The Bearcats were led by first-year head-coach John Brannen. The team played their home games at Fifth Third Arena as members of the American Athletic Conference.

Previous season
The Bearcats finished the 2018–19 season 28–7, 14–4 in AAC play, finishing in second place. They defeated SMU, Wichita State, and No. 1 seed Houston to win the AAC tournament for the second consecutive year, and received the conference's automatic bid to the NCAA tournament. As the No. 7 seed in the South region, they were upset by No. 10 seed Iowa in the first round. After the conclusion of the NCAA tournament, head coach Mick Cronin accepted the head-coaching position at UCLA. John Brannen, the head coach at nearby Northern Kentucky, would be hired to replace Cronin. In the transition, UC lost G/F Rashawn Fredericks and C Nysier Brooks - both of whom would've both been seniors. They also lost sophomore guard Logan Johnson and backup PF Eliel Nsoseme. Incoming freshman and Ohio's Mr. Basketball in 2019, Samari Curtis, also de-committed. Jarron Cumberland announced he would test the waters to enter the 2019 NBA draft on April 20, 2019. On May 27th, Cumberland announced he would return for his senior season.

Despite the deluge of transfers, Brannen was able to inspire a late-season recruiting renaissance, as he moved quickly to land Jeremiah Davenport, Chris Vogt, Mika Adams-Woods, Chris McNeal, Jaume Sorolla, and Jaevin Cumberland (in that order) - with the latter four commitments transpiring in under one week's time. It is worth noting that, at the time of the final scholarship being fulfilled, both Logan Johnson and Eliel Nsoseme were still in the transfer protocol and technically "could" return to UC; this series of signings effectively locked in their transfer from the program.

After all the dust settled, UC would have a final transfer enter the portal in redshirt Freshman LaQuill Hardnett. His spot would be filled shortly thereafter by the highest rated recruit of the 2019 class, Zach Harvey. Entering this season, new scholarship players would now outnumber returning players 7-6.

Offseason

Departing players

Incoming Transfers

2019 recruiting class

2020 Recruiting class

Preseason

AAC media poll
The AAC media poll was released on October 14, 2019, with the Bearcats predicted to finish third in the AAC.

Preseason Awards
American Athletic Conference
 All-AAC First Team - Jarron Cumberland (* Only unanimous selection)
 AAC Player of the Year - Jarron Cumberland

Sporting News

 All-America: Second team - Jarron Cumberland

Roster 

Preseason - Prince Toyambi underwent surgery to correct a cardiac issue, leading him to sit out for the entire season. 
Dec. 9, 2019 - Trevor Moore elected to transfer to Morgan State after the fall semester.
Feb. 4, 2020 - Jaume Sorolla left the team. He elected to return home to Spain to pursue a professional career.
Mar. 1, 2020 - Jeremiah Davenport did not make the trip to Houston. He later underwent surgery to correct a knee injury, leading him to sit out for the rest of the season.

Depth chart

Source

Schedule and results
The Bearcats traveled to in-state rival Ohio State to open the season for the second part of a home-and-home series with the Buckeyes. The Bearcats also began a home-and-home series with Tennessee beginning in the 2019–2020 season in Cincinnati. Tennessee visited Fifth Third Arena on December 18, 2019. The Bearcats traveled to Chicago to take on Iowa in the Chicago Legends event. Cincinnati traveled to the Virgin Islands to compete in the Paradise Jam tournament where they finished in third-place.

|-
!colspan=12 style=|Exhibition
|-

|-
!colspan=12 style=| Non-conference regular season
|-

|-
!colspan=12 style=| AAC Regular Season
|-

|-
!colspan=12 style=| AAC Tournament

Rankings

*AP does not release post-NCAA tournament rankings

Awards and honors

American Athletic Conference honors

All-AAC Awards
Defensive Player of the Year: Trevon Scott
Most Improved Player: Trevon Scott
Sportsmanship Award: Trevon Scott

All-AAC First Team
Jarron Cumberland
Trevon Scott

Player of the Week
Week 15: Trevon Scott

Weekly Honor Roll
Week 4: Chris Vogt
Week 10: Trevon Scott
Week 11: Jarron Cumberland
Week 12: Jarron Cumberland
Week 13: Jarron Cumberland
Week 14: Trevon Scott
Week 16: Trevon Scott
Week 18: Keith Williams
Source

References

Cincinnati
Cincinnati Bearcats men's basketball seasons
Cincinnati Bearcats men's basketball
Cincinnati Bearcats men's basketball